The Aghstafachay reservoir is a large reservoir in the Aghstafa District of northwestern Azerbaijan.

Overview 
The Aghstafachay reservoir was built on Aghstafa River in 1969 near the village of Cəfərli of Qazakh District. The overall volume of the reservoir is 120 million m3.

See also 
 Rivers and lakes in Azerbaijan
 Mingachevir reservoir
 Shamkir reservoir
 Araz reservoir

References

External links 
Satellite image of Agstafachay Reservoir

Aghstafa District
Qazax District
Reservoirs built in the Soviet Union
Reservoirs in Azerbaijan